Kamenev Nunatak is a ridge-like nunatak located inland from Odom Inlet and  west of Mount Whiting in Palmer Land, Antarctica. It was mapped by the United States Geological Survey (USGS) in 1974, and was named by the Advisory Committee on Antarctic Names for Yevgeniy N. Kamenev, a Soviet geologist who was an Exchange Scientist to the U.S. McMurdo Station in 1972. He participated as a member of the USGS geological and mapping party to the Lassiter Coast in 1972–73.

References

Nunataks of Palmer Land